Portals of Irontooth is a supplement for fantasy role-playing games published by Judges Guild in 1981.

Contents
Portals of Irontooth is a campaign setting, a fantasy world accessible by magical portal.  The world of Irontooth is briefly described (including wilderness encounters), with more detailed descriptions of the towns of Port Iron Bottom and Gnome Home.  The book includes two pages of color maps.

Portals of Irontooth is the second supplement in the Portals series, which is a set of adventure sites connected by a chain of interplanetary (or interdimensional) teleportation portals.  The first scenario in the series, Portals of Torsh, was an adventure set on a lizardman-dominated world; Irontooth deals with an iron-laden region of the world Hnoon.  The Irontooth colony and surrounding regions seem to be built above refined iron instead of bedrock.  Swamps and mountains come complete with rust flakes, and the region's indigenous lifeforms, the Irontooths, have skins of metal.  They are also immune to direct applications of magic.

Publication history
Portals of Irontooth was written by Rudy Kraft, with art by Kevin Siembieda, and was published by Judges Guild in 1981 as a 48-page book.

Reception
Aaron Allston reviewed the adventure in The Space Gamer No. 52. He commented that Portals of Irontooth was better than its predecessor, Portals of Torsh, and felt that the creatures being immune to direct applications of magic "makes this adventure interesting for magicians and clerics – they have to use their brains in creature encounters.  This adventure is not a specific quest or set of encounters – it is a region with inhabitants spelled out, history detailed, and scenarios suggested.  Adventurers can explore, hunt, interact with the human settlers or regional inhabitants, or whatever, without being dragged towards an inevitable specific encounter or end.  On the production end, the text is professionally typeset, the booklet features several color pages, and the artwork is pretty good." He continues: "That last generalization does not extend to the cover, which is unappealing and unanatomical.  Portals was cleanly typeset, but lacks editing.  Admittedly, this problem doesn't get in the way of the adventure; I simply have a bias against the consistent mangling of the English language." Allston concluded the review by saying, "This scenario is competently written, packaged, and presented, and offers opportunities for entertaining play.  The slice-at-a-time feel to this series doesn't promote in-depth adventures in any single setting, but neither does it prevent it.  I recommend Portals of Irontooth to scenario buyers."

References

Judges Guild fantasy role-playing game supplements
Role-playing game supplements introduced in 1981